Rock 'N Roll Mafia is the third studio album from the Greek band Matisse, released in Greece on 9 June 2009.

Track listing

"Rock 'N Roll Mafia"
"Today" ft. Johnette Napolitano
"I Like"
"Not Alone"
"Sunday Morning" ft. Lenka
"Last Dance"
"Party Tonight
"The Fear"
"Hell is Livin' With You"
"Rebels"
"Murder Me"
"Mary"

Matisse (band) albums
Sony Music Greece albums
2009 albums